Omladinski košarkaški klub Sloboda,, commonly referred to as Sloboda Tuzla, is a men's professional basketball club based in Tuzla, Bosnia and Herzegovina. They are currently competing in the Basketball Championship of Bosnia and Herzegovina. 

The club was founded in as KK Sloboda. Since 2011, the club has been competing under the legal name OKK Sloboda. The club is a part of the Sloboda multi-sports club. The Sloboda won 2 National League championships. They have played two different national league systems since 1946, including the Yugoslav Federal League system (1946–1992) and the Bosnian league system (1992 onward). They have also won 5 National Cup titles.

A FIBA Hall of Fame member Mirza Delibašić played for the club from 1968 to 1972.

History

Background
KK Sloboda, commonly referred to as Sloboda Dita, was a men's professional basketball club based in Tuzla, Bosnia and Herzegovina. The club was formed in 1946 and played its home games at Mejdan Sports Center. The club was shut down in September 2011 due to debts of 3.5 million KM.

Sloboda finished 5th in the inaugural 2001–02 Adriatic League session.

Renamed and re-organized
OKK Sloboda was founded in 2009 as a youth department of KK Sloboda. After the original club ceased operations in 2011, the new club—under the name of OKK Sloboda Tuzla (OKK Sloboda)—started to compete as they entered the A2 League (3rd-tier) for the 2011–12 season. They went on to win the 2012 A2 League championship and were subsequently promoted to the A1 Liga (2nd-tier) for the 2012–13 season. Sloboda finished second in the 2012–13 season with a record of 18-4 and went on to lose in the championship-deciding game to the first seeded OKK Spars Sarajevo by 10 points.

In 2013, the club was promoted to the Basketball Championship of Bosnia and Herzegovina for the 2013–14 season, returning to the top division for the first time since the 2010–11 season. For their return season to the Bosnian first league, Sloboda signed rookie head coach Damir Mulaomerović. He helped lead them to a fourth-place finish and subsequently earned himself a contract extension for the 2014–15 season.

In July 2019, the club got a wild card for the Second Adriatic League to play in the 2019–20 season.

Home arena 
The club plays its home games at SKPC Mejdan in Tuzla. Mejdan has two halls, one small and one big, with most games being played in the bigger hall that has a seating capacity of 4,900, while the smaller one has a seating capacity of 800 for basketball matches.

Players

Current roster

Coaches

KK Sloboda (1946–2011)

  Marijan Novović (1975–1977)
  Vlade Đurović (1978–1982)
  Borislav Džaković (1984–1987)
  Mihajlo Vuković (1989–1990)
  Borislav Džaković (1990–1992)
  Velimir Gašić (2001–2003)
  Borislav Džaković (2003–2006)
  Senad Muminović (2008–2010)
OKK Sloboda (2011–present)

  Damir Mulaomerović (2013–2015)
  Velimir Gašić (2016–2017)
  Eldar Kavgić (2017–2018)
  Ivan Velić (2018)
  Josip Pandža (2018–2019)
  Damir Mulaomerović (2019–2021)
  Nedim Džemić (2021–present)

Trophies 
Bosnia and Herzegovina Championship
Winner (2): 1993–94, 1995–96
Bosnia and Herzegovina Cup
Winner (5): 1994, 1995, 1996, 1999, 2001
Bosnian A1 League (2nd-tier)
Winner (7): 1993–94, 1995–96, 1996–97, 1998–99, 1999–2000, 2000–01, 2001–02
Bosnian A2 League (3rd-tier)
Winner (1): 2012–13OKK

Notes
OKK Won by OKK Sloboda

Notable players
KK Sloboda
 Asım Pars
 Mirza Begić
 Nedim Dal
 Mirza Delibašić
 Jasmin Hukić
 Zlatko Jovanović
 Elmedin Kikanović
 Mileta Lisica
 Damir Mršić
 Damir Mulaomerović
 Dalibor Peršić
 Mirza Teletović

References

External links 
Official website
Team profile at Eurobasket.com

Basketball teams established in 2009
Sport in Tuzla
Basketball teams established in 1946
Basketball teams in Bosnia and Herzegovina
Basketball teams in Yugoslavia